Gaylon L. Stacy (October 19, 1934 – October 10, 2011) was an American politician. He served as a Republican member for the 81st district of the Oklahoma House of Representatives.

Life and career 
Stacy was born in Bridge Creek, Oklahoma, the son of Onetia and Bryan Stacy. He attended the University of Oklahoma and worked for radio broadcasting stations such as KNOR, WNAD and KWTV-DT.

In 1985, Stacy was elected to represent the 81st district of the Oklahoma House of Representatives, succeeding Steve Sill. He served until 1989, when he was succeeded by Ray Vaughn.

Stacy died in October 2011 in Edmond, Oklahoma, at the age of 76.

References 

1934 births
2011 deaths
Republican Party members of the Oklahoma House of Representatives
20th-century American politicians
20th-century Members of the Oklahoma House of Representatives
University of Oklahoma alumni
American talk radio hosts